Couço is a civil parish in the municipality of Coruche, Portugal. The population in 2011 was 2,765, in an area of 346.58 km².

References

Freguesias of Coruche